Doris Wagner (born 28 January 1963) is a German politician from Alliance 90/The Greens. She was a Member of the Bundestag for Bavaria from 2013 to 2017.

See also 
 List of members of the 18th Bundestag

References 

Living people
1963 births
Members of the Bundestag 2013–2017
21st-century German politicians
21st-century German women politicians
Members of the Bundestag for Bavaria
Female members of the Bundestag
Members of the Bundestag for Alliance 90/The Greens